Duncan Farm is an archaeological site located on a farmstead south of Illinois Route 100 in Jersey County, Illinois, near the city of Grafton. The site, which dates from the Woodland period, includes two burial mounds and a habitation site. The site was part of the Hopewell exchange system in Illinois and is the closest neighboring village site to the Golden Eagle regional transaction center, a major trade and social hub in the system. In addition, the site is archaeologically significant due to its distinctive stratification, which allows its artifacts to be easily dated.

The site was added to the National Register of Historic Places on August 24, 1982.

See also
Smith-Duncan House and Eastman Barn, historic buildings on the same farmstead

References

Archaeological sites on the National Register of Historic Places in Illinois
Geography of Jersey County, Illinois
Mounds in Illinois
National Register of Historic Places in Jersey County, Illinois